Abutilon listeri , commonly known as the lantern flower, is a tropical shrub in the Malvaceae or mallow family. It is endemic to Christmas Island, an Australian territory in the north-eastern Indian Ocean. Its specific epithet honours British zoologist and plant collector Joseph Jackson Lister, who visited the island on HMS Egeria in 1887.

Description
Abutilon listeri is a common shrub on Christmas Island, growing to 1–3 m in height. The leaves are circular to broadly ovate, either entire or weakly crenate, and about 90–160 mm long. The yellow flowers occur in loose, terminal panicles.

Distribution and habitat
Found only on Christmas Island, the lantern flower grows in natural clearings and the rainforest margin behind the sea cliffs on the lower terraces, and is often found in secondary growth and along paths and tracks. It responds well to environmental disturbance.

Taxonomy
The lantern flower is closely related to the sympatric A. auritum; both have a paniculate inflorescence and fewer than 15 mericarps.

References

Notes

Sources
 
 

listeri
Endemic flora of Christmas Island
Malvales of Australia
Plants described in 1893
Taxa named by Edmund Gilbert Baker